Prince Gyeongjang was a Goryeo Royal Family member as the third son of Wang Uk and a grandson of Wang Geon, its founder. He was the full brother of King Seongjong, Queen Heonae, and Queen Heonjeong. Since their parents were died when he was young, he was raised by his paternal grandmother, Queen Sinjeong alongside his other siblings. Although his wife was not recorded, he had a daughter who would become the fifth wife of King Hyeonjong.

References

Korean princes
Year of birth unknown
Year of death unknown
10th-century Korean people